Jesse is an American sitcom television series created by Ira Ungerleider and starring Christina Applegate, that ran on NBC from September 24, 1998, to May 25, 2000, for two seasons of a total 42 episodes.

The series was produced by Bright/Kauffman/Crane Productions in association with Warner Bros. Television.

Synopsis
The show stars Christina Applegate as single mother Jesse Warner, raising her nine-year-old son, Little John, in Buffalo, New York. She works for her overbearing father in a German-themed bar, serving beer while wearing a dirndl. Jesse's love interest, a Chilean named Diego (Bruno Campos), gains a rival when her former husband comes to town, intent on winning her back.

In the second season, Jesse becomes a nurse and stories revolve around her friends instead of her family.

Cast

Main
 Christina Applegate as Jesse Warner
 Bruno Campos as Diego Vasquez
 Eric Lloyd as "Little John" Warner
 Liza Snyder as Linda
 Jennifer Milmore as Carrie
 John Lehr as John Warner, Jr. (season 1)
 David DeLuise as Darren Warner (season 1)
 George Dzundza as John Warner, Sr. (season 1)
 Kevin Rahm as Dr. Danny Kozak (season 2)
 Darryl Theirse as Kurt Bemis (guest season 1; main season 2)

Recurring
 Michael Weatherly as Roy Bently (season 1)
 Michael Welch as Gabe (season 2)
 Jacqueline Obradors as Irma (season 2)

Episodes
While Jesse was in the top 20 in the Nielsen ratings regularly, the show lost much of the audience from Friends, its powerful lead-in. In season 2, Jesse lost almost 20% of the Friends audience. As a result, NBC decided to cancel the show after its second season. A total of 42 episodes were produced.

Season 1 (1998–99)

Season 2 (1999–2000)

References

External links
 
 

1990s American sitcoms
1998 American television series debuts
2000s American sitcoms
2000 American television series endings
English-language television shows
NBC original programming
Television series by Warner Bros. Television Studios
Television shows set in Buffalo, New York